Student politics in Namibia encompasses the activities and culture among Namibian students, mostly from the tertiary level of education such as the University of Namibia, Namibia University of Science and Technology and the International University of Management. It is mostly played by youth & student leaders from Namibia National Students Organization, UNAM SRC, NUST SRC and other student organizations who liaise nationally with the government to address student issues.

References

Student organisations based in Namibia
Politics of Namibia